Marliese Echner-Klingmann (26 January 1937 – 16 November 2020) was a German poet and playwright.

Biography
Born as Marie-Elisabeth Echner in Heidelberg, Echner-Klingmann grew up in Eschelbronn. She worked as an office administration clerk until her marriage in 1959. She had two children: Her son Michael, born in 1961 and her daughter Christiane, born in 1964.

She began writing at the middle of the 1960s. In 1988, Echner-Klingmann founded the acting-group "Sellemols" in Eschelbronn. She died at 16 November 2020 and is buried at the Cemetery of Eschelbronn.

Awards and honours
In 2008, she was awarded the :de:Heimatmedaille des Landes Baden-Württemberg:Heimatmedaille des Landes Baden-Württemberg.

Bibliography

Fiction
 with Ilse Rohnacher: Stoppelfelder streichle. Mundartgedichte. Pfälzische Verlagsanstalt, Landau, 1984
 with Ilse Rohnacher: Du un ich. Mundartgedichte. Heidelberger Verlagsanstalt, Heidelberg, 1988
 with Ilse Rohnacher: Blädderraschle Mundartgedichte. C. Winter, Heidelberg, 1996
 Dorfgeschichten in Mundart und Schriftdeutsch. Info-Verlag, Karlsruhe, 2004
 Kraichgauer Wortschatz. Wörter und Wendungen aus dem Östlichen Kraichgau. Hrsg. vom Heimatverein Kraichgau Eppingen, Druckerei Odenwälder, Buchen, 2001

Plays
 Sellemols. Vom Leineweber- zum Schreinerdorf (1989)
 Veronika Seyfert (1993)
 Aus der Lisbeth ihrm Tagebuch. E Dorf em Kraichgau vun 1939 bis 1945 (1996)
 S Leewe geht weiter - E Dorf em Kraichgau vun 1945 bis 1954 (2002)
 Zuzenhausen, ein Dorf an der Elsenz (2004)
 Dorfleewe, wud Groußeltern noch Kinner ware (2008)

References

1937 births
2020 deaths
20th-century German writers
20th-century German women writers
21st-century German writers
21st-century German women writers
German women poets
Writers from Heidelberg